Umberto Veronesi  (28 November 1925 – 8 November 2016) was an Italian oncologist, physician, scientist and politician, internationally known for his contributions on prevention and treatment of breast cancer throughout a career spanning over fifty years.

Early life and education
Veronesi was born in Milan. He obtained his degree in medicine from the University of Milan in 1952, and dedicated his professional life to the study and treatment of cancer.

Scientific career
After spending brief periods in England and France, he joined the Italian Cancer Institute in Milan as a volunteer. Veronesi challenged the dominant paradigm among surgeons that cancer could only be treated with aggressive surgery. He championed a paradigm shift in cancer care from "maximum tolerated" to "minimum effective" treatment. He was a pioneer of breast-conserving surgery in early breast cancer as an alternative to a radical mastectomy. He developed the technique of quadrantectomy, which limits surgical resection to the affected quarter of the breast. Between 1973 and 1980 he led the first prospective randomised trial of breast conserving surgery (the Milan I trial), which compared outcomes from radical mastectomy against quadrantectomy. The results, published in 1981, and confirmed in 2002 in a 20-year follow-up study, played a key role in establishing breast conserving surgery as standard of care for patients with early breast cancer, alongside results from trials of lumpectomy led by the US breast surgeon Bernard Fisher.
Veronesi supported and promoted scientific research aimed at improving conservative surgical techniques, including sentinel lymph node biopsy, which resulted in axillary dissection in breast cancer with clinically negative lymph nodes no longer being performed. He also contributed to breast cancer prevention conducting studies on tamoxifen and retinoids and verifying their capabilities to prevent the formation of carcinoma. He was an activist in anti-tobacco campaigns. In 1994 he founded the European Institute of Oncology, which he directed until his death. He was appointed President of the Scientific Committee of the Italy-USA Foundation in 2010. In 2009, through his foundation (Fondazione Veronesi), he started the project "Science for Peace", in order to promote peaceful relations through scientific development.

He was Chairman of the BioGeM Scientific Committee.

Political career
1993 member of the national Commission against cancer.
1998 member of the national Commission for the evaluation of "Di Bella therapy" against cancer.
2000-2001 Minister of Health under the Amato II Cabinet.
On 25 April 2000 he was appointed to the Amato II Cabinet as the minister of health and was in office until 11 June 2001. He was instrumental in the promotion of the anti-smoking in public places act.
2008 Main candidate in Milan for the Democratic Party (PD) to the Italian Senate.
2010-2011 Chairman of Italy's Nuclear Safety Agency.

Ethical views
Over the years, Veronesi publicly expressed his views on several ethical issues in interviews, televised debates and his books.

Veronesi identified himself as an agnostic, not believing in any form of afterlife. He claimed that human beings should not consider death a terrifying moment, but rather accept it as a biological necessity.

He supported active euthanasia, affirming the right of any individual to end their life if it became unbearable due to suffering or loss of dignity. He advocated the necessity to regulate euthanasia at a national level, citing Dutch legislation as a good starting point; he was promoting a campaign for the introduction of living will as a legally binding agreement between the doctor and the incapacitated patient.

Veronesi supported genetically modified organisms as a way to produce food with higher nutritional capabilities and deprived of potentially carcinogenic substances. He criticized the current opposition to GMOs as being due to lack of scientific knowledge.

Vegetarianism
Veronesi was an ethical vegetarian and an animal rights advocate. He was a vegetarian for ethical reasons but also promoted the health benefits of a lacto-ovo vegetarian diet.

In 2012, Veronesi co-authored Verso la scelta vegetariana (Towards the vegetarian choice) with Mario Pappagallo. The book contains 200 vegetarian recipes.

Awards
 Veronesi received thirteen national and international honorary degrees in medicine, medical biotechnologies, physics, agricultural sciences and pedagogical sciences.
 In 2002 he received the King Faisal International Prize. In this regard, he then stated:
 
 On 31 January 2004 he became honorary citizen of Asti.
 In 2009 he received the America Prize of the Italy–USA Foundation.
 On 2 August 2010, they named after him a piece of beachfront at Jesolo Beach.
 In 2012 he received the "Art, Science and Peace Prize" for his career.

Selected publications
Verso la scelta vegetariana (with Mario Pappagallo, 2012)
Breast Cancer: Innovations in Research and Management (with Aron Goldhirsch, 2017)
Il diritto di essere umani (2018)
I segreti della lunga vita (with Mario Pappagallo, 2021)

See also
 European Institute of Oncology

References

Sources

External links

 European Institute of Oncology Website 
 ecancermedicalscience (Open Access journal of the European Institute of Oncology) 
  
 Fondazione Umberto Veronesi 

1925 births
2016 deaths
20th-century Italian physicians
21st-century Italian physicians
Cancer researchers
Italian agnostics
Italian oncologists
Italian Ministers of Health
Italian vegetarianism activists
Physicians from Milan
Politicians from Milan
Vegetarian cookbook writers